Mubende Regional Referral Hospital, commonly known as Mubende Hospital is a hospital in the town of Mubende, in the Central Region of Uganda. It is the referral hospital for the districts of Mubende, Mityana, Kiboga, and Kyankwanzi.

Location
The coordinates of Mubende Hospital are 0°34'03.0"N, 31°23'35.0"E (Latitude:0.567496; Longitude:31.393041).

Overview
Mubende Hospital is a public hospital, funded by the Uganda Ministry of Health and general care in the hospital is free. It is one of the thirteen Regional Referral Hospitals in Uganda. The hospital is designated as one of the fifteen Internship Hospitals in Uganda where graduates of Ugandan medical schools can serve one year of internship under the supervision of qualified specialists and consultants.

The hospital serves a catchment population estimated at about 610,600 people, as of July 2020. The hospital collaborates with Mildmay Uganda, in the implementation of the Accelerating Epidemic Control Project against HIV/AIDS, that covers the districts of Kiboga, Kyankwanzi, Mubende, Mityana, Luweero, Kassanda, Nakasongola and Nakaseke. The project is funded by the United States' Centers for Disease Control and by the President's Emergency Plan for AIDS Relief (PEPFAR). In July 2020, the project was in its third consecutive year of implementation.

See also
List of hospitals in Uganda
2022 Ebola outbreak, the hospital treated some cases of the Sudan Ebola strain

References

External links
  Mubende District Internet Portal

Hospitals in Uganda
Mubende District
Central Region, Uganda
Teaching hospitals in Uganda